Maclellan Gymnasium is a 4,177-seat multi-purpose arena in Chattanooga, Tennessee.  It is home to the University of Tennessee at Chattanooga Mocs women's volleyball and wrestling teams.  It used to host the Mocs basketball teams until McKenzie Arena opened in 1982.

External links
Stadium information

Defunct college basketball venues in the United States
Indoor arenas in Tennessee
Sports venues in Tennessee
Chattanooga Mocs basketball
Sports venues in Chattanooga, Tennessee
1961 establishments in Tennessee
Sports venues completed in 1961
College volleyball venues in the United States
College wrestling venues in the United States
Wrestling venues in Tennessee